List of amphibian genera lists the vertebrate class of amphibians by genus, spanning two superorders.

Superorder Batrachia

Order Anura 

Frogs

Suborder Archaeobatrachia 

 Family Alytidae - sometimes called Discoglossidae
 Genus Alytes - Midwife toad
 Genus Discoglossus
 Genus Latonia
 Family Ascaphidae
 Genus Ascaphus - Tailed frog
 Family Bombinatoridae
 Genus Barbourula
 Genus Bombina - Fire-bellied toad
 Family Leiopelmatidae
 Genus Leiopelma

Suborder Mesobatrachia 

 Family Megophryidae
 Genus Borneophrys
 Genus Brachytarsophrys - Karin Hills frog
 Genus Leptobrachella
 Genus Leptobrachium - Eastern spadefoot toad
 Genus Leptolalax
 Genus Megophrys
 Genus Ophryophryne
 Genus Oreolalax
 Genus Scutiger
 Family Pelobatidae
 Genus Pelobates - European spadefoot toad
 Family Pelodytidae
 Genus Pelodytes - Parsley frog
 Family Pipidae
 Genus Hymenochirus - African dwarf frog
 Genus Pipa
 Genus Pseudhymenochirus - Merlin's dwarf gray frog
 Genus Xenopus
 Family Rhinophrynidae
 Genus Rhinophrynus
 Family Scaphiopodidae - American spadefoot toad
 Genus Scaphiopus
 Genus Spea

Suborder Neobatrachia 

 Family Amphignathodontidae – sometimes in Hemiphractidae
 Genus Flectonotus
 Genus Gastrotheca
 Family Aromobatidae – sometimes in Dendrobatidae
 Genus Allobates
 Genus Anomaloglossus
 Genus Aromobates
 Genus Mannophryne
 Genus Rheobates
 Family Arthroleptidae
 Genus Arthroleptis
 Genus Astylosternus
 Genus Cardioglossa
 Genus Leptodactylodon
 Genus Leptopelis
 Genus Nyctibates
 Genus Scotobleps
 Genus Trichobatrachus
 Family Brachycephalidae
 Genus Brachycephalus - Saddleback toad
 Genus Ischnocnema
 Family Bufonidae - True toad
 Genus Adenomus
 Genus Altiphrynoides
 Genus Amazophrynella
 Genus Amietophrynus - see Sclerophrys
 Genus Anaxyrus
 Genus Ansonia
 Genus Atelopus
 Genus Blythophryne
 Genus Bufo
 Genus Bufoides
 Genus Capensibufo
 Genus Churamiti
 Genus Crepidophryne - see Incilius
 Genus Dendrophryniscus
 Genus Didynamipus - Four-digit toad
 Genus Duttaphrynus
 Genus Epidalea - Natterjack toad
 Genus Frostius
 Genus Incilius
 Genus Ingerophrynus
 Genus Laurentophryne - Parker's tree toad
 Genus Leptophryne
 Genus Melanophryniscus
 Genus Mertensophryne
 Genus Metaphryniscus
 Genus Nectophryne
 Genus Nectophrynoides
 Genus Nimbaphrynoides
 Genus Oreophrynella
 Genus Osornophryne
 Genus Parapelophryne
 Genus Pedostibes
 Genus Pelophryne
 Genus Pseudepidalea
 Genus Pseudobufo
 Genus Rhinella
 Genus Sabahphrynus
 Genus Sclerophrys
 Genus Schismaderma - African red toad
 Genus Truebella
 Genus Werneria
 Genus Wolterstorffina
 Genus Xanthophryne
 Family Calyptocephalellidae - sometimes in Bufonidae
 Genus Calyptocephalella
 Genus Telmatobufo
 Family Centrolenidae – Glass frog, including Allophrynidae
 Genus Allophryne - Tukeit Hill frog
 Genus Celsiella
 Genus Centrolene
 Genus Chimerella
 Genus Cochranella
 Genus Espadarana
 Genus Hyalinobatrachium
 Genus Ikakogi
 Genus Nymphargus
 Genus Rulyrana
 Genus Sachatamia
 Genus Teratohyla
 Genus Vitreorana
 Family Ceratobatrachidae - often listed in Family Ranidae
 Genus Alcalus
 Genus Cornufer
 Genus Liurana
 Genus Platymantis
 Family Ceratophryidae
 Genus Ceratophrys
 Genus Chacophrys
 Genus Lepidobatrachus
 Family Conrauidae - often listed in Family Ranidae
 Genus Conraua
 Family Craugastoridae - formerly in Dendrobatidae
 Genus Barycholos
 Genus Bryophryne
 Genus Ceuthomantis
 Genus Craugastor
 Genus Dischidodactylus
 Genus Euparkerella
 Genus Geobatrachus
 Genus Haddadus
 Genus Holoaden
 Genus Hypodactylus
 Genus Lynchius
 Genus Niceforonia
 Genus Noblella
 Genus Oreobates
 Genus Phrynopus
 Genus Pristimantis
 Genus Psychrophrynella
 Genus Strabomantis
 Genus Yunganastes
 Family Dendrobatidae - Poison dart frog
 Genus Adelphobates
 Genus Ameerega
 Genus Andinobates
 Genus Colostethus
 Genus Dendrobates
 Genus Epipedobates
 Genus Excidobates
 Genus Hyloxalus
 Genus Minyobates
 Genus Oophaga
 Genus Phyllobates
 Genus Ranitomeya
 Genus Silverstoneia
 Family Dicroglossidae - often listed in Family Ranidae
 Genus Allopaa
 Genus Chrysopaa
 Genus Euphlyctis
 Genus Fejervarya
 Genus Hoplobatrachus
 Genus Ingerana
 Genus Limnonectes
 Genus Minervarya
 Genus Nannophrys
 Genus Nanorana -
 Genus Occidozyga
 Genus Ombrana
 Genus Quasipaa
 Genus Sphaerotheca
 Genus Zakerana
 Family Eleutherodactylidae - formerly in Brachycephalidae
 Genus Adelophryne
 Genus Diasporus
 Genus Eleutherodactylus
 Genus Phyzelaphryne
 Family Heleophrynidae - Ghost frog
 Genus Hadromophryne - Natal ghost frog
 Genus Heleophryne
 Family Hemiphractidae
 Genus Cryptobatrachus
 Genus Flectonotus
 Genus Fritziana
 Genus Gastrotheca
 Genus Hemiphractus
 Genus Stefania
 Family Hemisotidae
 Genus Hemisus - Shovelnose frog
 Family Hylidae – including Cryptobatrachidae, Hemiphractidae
 Genus Acris – Cricket frog
 Genus Agalychnis
 Genus Anotheca – Spiny-headed tree frog
 Genus Aparasphenodon
 Genus Aplastodiscus – Canebrake tree frogs
 Genus Argenteohyla
 Genus Bokermannohyla
 Genus Bromeliohyla
 Genus Charadrahyla
 Genus Corythomantis
 Genus Cruziohyla
 Genus Cyclorana
 Genus Dendropsophus
 Genus Duellmanohyla
 Genus Ecnomiohyla
 Genus Exerodonta
 Genus Hyla
 Genus Hylomantis
 Genus Hyloscirtus
 Genus Hypsiboas
 Genus Isthmohyla
 Genus Itapotihyla
 Genus Litoria
 Genus Lysapsus
 Genus Megastomatohyla
 Genus Myersiohyla
 Genus Nyctimantis
 Genus Nyctimystes
 Genus Osteocephalus – Slender-legged tree frogs
 Genus Osteopilus
 Genus Pachymedusa – Mexican leaf frog
 Genus Pelodryas
 Genus Phasmahyla
 Genus Phrynomedusa
 Genus Phyllodytes
 Genus Phyllomedusa
 Genus Plectrohyla – Spikethumb frog
 Genus Pseudacris – Chorus frog
 Genus Pseudis
 Genus Ptychohyla
 Genus Scarthyla
 Genus Scinax
 Genus Smilisca – Mexican burrowing tree frog
 Genus Sphaenorhynchus
 Genus Tepuihyla
 Genus Tlalocohyla
 Genus Trachycephalus
 Genus Triprion
 Genus Xenohyla
 Family Hylodidae
 Genus Crossodactylus
 Genus Hylodes
 Genus Megaelosia
 Family Hyperoliidae
 Genus Acanthixalus
 Genus Afrixalus
 Genus Alexteroon
 Genus Arlequinus
 Genus Callixalus
 Genus Chlorolius
 Genus Chrysobatrachus
 Genus Cryptothylax
 Genus Heterixalus
 Genus Hyperolius
 Genus Kassina
 Genus Kassinula
 Genus Morerella
 Genus Opisthothylax
 Genus Paracassina
 Genus Phlyctimantis
 Genus Semnodactylus - Weale's running frog
 Genus Tachycnemis - Seychelles treefrog
 Family Leiuperidae - sometimes in Leptodactylidae
 Genus Edalorhina
 Genus Engystomops
 Genus Physalaemus
 Genus Pleurodema
 Genus Pseudopaludicola
 Family Leptodactylidae – including Cycloramphidae
 Genus Adenomera
 Genus Crossodactylodes
 Genus Edalorhina - see Family Leiuperidae
 Genus Engystomops - see Family Leiuperidae
 Genus Hydrolaetare
 Genus Leptodactylus
 Genus Lithodytes
 Genus Paratelmatobius
 Genus Physalaemus - see Family Leiuperidae
 Genus Pleurodem - see Family Leiuperidae
 Genus Pseudopaludicola - see Family Leiuperidae
 Genus Rupirana
 Genus Scythrophrys
 Family Mantellidae
 Genus Aglyptodactylus
 Genus Blommersia
 Genus Boehmantis
 Genus Boophis
 Genus Gephyromantis
 Genus Guibemantis
 Genus Laliostoma
 Genus Mantella
 Genus Mantidactylus
 Genus Spinomantis
 Genus Tsingymantis
 Genus Wakea
 Family Microhylidae – including Brevicipitidae
 Genus Adelastes
 Genus Anodonthyla
 Genus Aphantophryne
 Genus Arcovomer
 Genus Asterophrys
 Genus Austrochaperina
 Genus Barygenys
 Genus Callulops
 Genus Chaperina
 Genus Chiasmocleis
 Genus Choerophryne
 Genus Cophixalus
 Genus Cophyla
 Genus Copiula
 Genus Ctenophryne
 Genus Dasypops
 Genus Dermatonotus
 Genus Dyscophus
 Genus Elachistocleis
 Genus Gastrophryne
 Genus Gastrophrynoides
 Genus Genyophryne
 Genus Glyphoglossus
 Genus Hamptophryne
 Genus Hoplophryne
 Genus Hylophorbus
 Genus Hypopachus
 Genus Kalophrynus
 Genus Kaloula
 Genus Liophryne
 Genus Madecassophryne
 Genus Mantophryne
 Genus Melanobatrachus
 Genus Metamagnusia
 Genus Metaphrynella
 Genus Microhyla
 Genus Micryletta
 Genus Mini
 Genus Myersiella
 Genus Mysticellus - Franky's narrow-mouthed frog
 Genus Oninia
 Genus Oreophryne
 Genus Otophryne
 Genus Oxydactyla
 Genus Paedophryne
 Genus Paradoxophyla
 Genus Parhoplophryne
 Genus Phrynella
 Genus Phrynomantis
 Genus Plethodontohyla
 Genus Pseudocallulops
 Genus Rhombophryne
 Genus Scaphiophryne
 Genus Sphenophryne
 Genus Stereocyclops
 Genus Stumpffia
 Genus Synapturanus
 Genus Uperodon
 Genus Vietnamophryne
 Genus Xenorhina
 Family Myobatrachidae - including Limnodynastidae, Rheobatrachidae
 Genus Adelotus - Tusked frog
 Genus Arenophryne
 Genus Assa
 Genus Crinia
 Genus Geocrinia
 Genus Heleioporus
 Genus Lechriodus
 Genus Limnodynastes
 Genus Metacrinia
 Genus Mixophyes - Barred frogs
 Genus Myobatrachus
 Genus Neobatrachus
 Genus Notaden
 Genus Opisthodon
 Genus Paracrinia - Haswell's frog
 Genus Philoria
 Genus Pseudophryne
 Genus Rheobatrachus - Gastric-brooding frog
 Genus Spicospina
 Genus Taudactylus
 Genus Uperoleia
 Family Nasikabatrachidae - often listed in Family Sooglossidae
 Genus Nasikabatrachus
 Family Nyctibatrachidae - often listed in Family Ranidae
 Genus Astrobatrachus
 Genus Lankanectes
 Genus Nyctibatrachus
 Family Petropedetidae - often listed in Family Ranidae
 Genus Arthroleptides
 Genus Ericabatrachus
 Genus Petropedetes
 Family Phrynobatrachidae - often listed in Family Ranidae
 Genus Phrynobatrachus
 Family Pseudidae
 Genus Pseudis - see Family Hylidae
 Family Ptychadenidae - often listed in Family Ranidae
 Genus Hildebrandtia
 Genus Lanzarana
 Genus Ptychadena
 Family Pyxicephalidae - often listed in Family Ranidae
 Genus Amietia
 Genus Anhydrophryne
 Genus Arthroleptella
 Genus Aubria
 Genus Cacosternum
 Genus Microbatrachella - Micro frog
 Genus Natalobatrachus - Natal diving frog
 Genus Nothophryne
 Genus Poyntonia
 Genus Pyxicephalus
 Genus Strongylopus
 Genus Tomopterna
 Family Ranidae – True frog, including Ceratobatrachidae, Dicroglossidae, Micrixalidae, Nyctibatrachidae, Petropedetidae, Phrynobatrachidae, Ptychadenidae, Pyxicephalidae
 Genus Afrana
 Genus Allopaa - see Family Dicroglossidae
 Genus Amietia - see Famlily Pyxicephalidae
 Genus Amolops
 Genus Anhydrophryne - see Famlily Pyxicephalidae
 Genus Arthroleptella - see Famlily Pyxicephalidae
 Genus Arthroleptides - see Famlily Petropedetidae
 Genus Aubria - see Famlily Pyxicephalidae
 Genus Babina - sometimes included in Rana
 Genus Batrachylodes
 Genus Cacosternum - see Famlily Petropedetidae
 Genus Ceratobatrachus - see Family Ceratobatrachidae
 Genus Chaparana - see Family Dicroglossidae
 Genus Chrysopaa - see Family Dicroglossidae
 Genus Clinotarsus - formerly in Rana, includes Nasirana
 Genus Conraua - see Family Conrauidae
 Genus Dimorphognathus - see Phrynobatrachus
 Genus Ericabatrachus - see Famlily Petropedetidae
 Genus Euphlyctis - see Family Dicroglossidae
 Genus Fejervarya - see Family Dicroglossidae, formerly in Rana, paraphyletic
 Genus Glandirana - formerly in Rana
 Genus Hildebrandtia
 Genus Hoplobatrachus - see Family Dicroglossidae
 Genus Huia - polyphyletic
 Genus Hylarana - formerly in Rana
 Genus Humerana
 Genus Indirana
 Genus Ingerana - see Family Dicroglossidae
 Genus Lankanectes - see Family Nyctibatrachidae
 Genus Lanzarana - see Family Ptychadenidae
 Genus Limnonectes - see Family Dicroglossidae
 Genus Lithobates - formerly in Rana
 Genus Meristogenys - might belong in Huia
 Genus Micrixalus
 Genus Microbatrachella - see Family Pyxicephalidae
 Genus Minervarya - see Family Dicroglossidae
 Genus Nannophrys - see Family Dicroglossidae
 Genus Nanorana - see Family Dicroglossidae
 Genus Natalobatrachus - see Family Pyxicephalidae
 Genus Nothophryne - see Family Pyxicephalidae
 Genus Nyctibatrachus - see Family Nyctibatrachidae
 Genus Occidozyga - see Family Dicroglossidae
 Genus Odorrana - formerly in Rana
 Genus Paa - see Family Dicroglossidae
 Genus Palmatorappia - see Family Ceratobatrachidae genus Cornufer
 Genus Pelophylax - formerly in Rana, probably paraphyletic
 Genus Petropedetes - see Family Petropedetidae
 Genus Phrynobatrachus - see Family Phrynobatrachidae
 Genus Phrynodon - see Family Phrynobatrachidae
 Genus Platymantis - see Family Ceratobatrachidae
 Genus Pseudoamolops - see Rana
 Genus Poyntonia - see Family Pyxicephalidae
 Genus Pterorana - Indian flying frog
 Genus Ptychadena - see Family Ptychadenidae
 Genus Pyxicephalus - see Famlily Pyxicephalidae
 Genus Rana
 Genus Sanguirana - formerly in Rana
 Genus Sphaerotheca - see Family Dicroglossidae
 Genus Staurois
 Genus Strongylopus - see Famlily Pyxicephalidae
 Genus Tomopterna - see Famlily Pyxicephalidae
 Family Ranixalidae - sometimes in Ranidae
 Genus Indirana
 Family Rhacophoridae
 Genus Beddomixalus
 Genus Buergeria
 Genus Chiromantis
 Genus Feihyla
 Genus Ghatixalus
 Genus Gracixalus
 Genus Kurixalus
 Genus Liuixalus
 Genus Mercurana
 Genus Nasutixalus
 Genus Nyctixalus
 Genus Philautus
 Genus Polypedates
 Genus Pseudophilautus
 Genus Raorchestes
 Genus Rhacophorus
 Genus Taruga
 Genus Theloderma
 Family Rhinodermatidae – sometimes in Cycloramphidae
 Genus Rhinoderma
 Family Sooglossidae
 Genus Sechellophryne
 Genus Sooglossus
 Family Strabomantidae - some formerly in Brachycephalidae, all listed in Craugastoridae
 Genus Atopophrynus
 Genus Barycholos
 Genus Bryophryne
 Genus Dischidodactylus
 Genus Euparkerella
 Genus Geobatrachus
 Genus Holoaden
 Genus Hypodactylus
 Genus Lynchius
 Genus Niceforonia
 Genus Noblella
 Genus Oreobates
 Genus Phrynopus
 Genus Pristimantis
 Genus Psychrophrynella
 Genus Strabomantis

Order Urodela 

Salamanders

Suborder Cryptobranchoidea 

 Family Cryptobranchidae - Giant salamander
 Genus Andrias
 Genus Cryptobranchus - Hellbender
 Family Hynobiidae - Asiatic salamander
 Genus Batrachuperus
 Genus Hynobius
 Genus Liua
 Genus Onychodactylus
 Genus Pachyhynobius
 Genus Paradactylodon
 Genus Pseudohynobius
 Genus Protohynobius - Puxiong salamander
 Genus Ranodon
 Genus Salamandrella

Suborder Salamandroidea 

 Family Ambystomatidae
 Genus Ambystoma - Mole salamander
 Family Amphiumidae
 Genus Amphiuma
 Family Dicamptodontidae
 Genus Dicamptodon - Pacific giant salamander
 Family Plethodontidae
 Genus Aneides - Climbing salamander
 Genus Atylodes - Brown cave salamander
 Genus Batrachoseps - Slender salamander
 Genus Bolitoglossa
 Genus Bradytriton
 Genus Chiropterotriton
 Genus Cryptotriton
 Genus Dendrotriton
 Genus Desmognathus
 Genus Ensatina
 Genus Eurycea - Brook salamander
 Genus Gyrinophilus
 Genus Hemidactylium - Four-toed salamander
 Genus Hydromantes
 Genus Karsenia - Korean crevice salamander
 Genus Nototriton
 Genus Nyctanolis
 Genus Oedipina
 Genus Parvimolge
 Genus Phaeognathus - Red Hills salamander
 Genus Plethodon - Woodland salamander
 Genus Pseudoeurycea
 Genus Pseudotriton
 Genus Speleomantes
 Genus Stereochilus - Many-lined salamander
 Genus Thorius
 Genus Urspelerpes
 Family Proteidae
 Genus Necturus
 Genus Proteus - Olm
 Family Rhyacotritonidae
 Genus Rhyacotriton - Torrent salamander
 Family Salamandridae
 Genus Calotriton
 Genus Chioglossa - Gold-striped salamander
 Genus Cynops - Fire belly newts
 Genus Echinotriton
 Genus Euproctus
 Genus Ichthyosaura - Alpine newt
 Genus Lissotriton
 Genus Lyciasalamandra
 Genus Mertensiella - Caucasian salamander
 Genus Neurergus
 Genus Notophthalmus
 Genus Ommatotriton
 Genus Pachytriton
 Genus Paramesotriton
 Genus Pleurodeles
 Genus Salamandra
 Genus Salamandrina
 Genus Taricha
 Genus Triturus
 Genus Tylototriton
 Family Sirenidae
 Genus Pseudobranchus - Dwarf siren
 Genus Siren

Superorder Gymnophiona

Order Apoda 

Caecilians

  Family Caeciliidae
 Genus Boulengerula - see Family Herpelidae 
 Genus Brasilotyphlus - see Family Siphonopidae 
 Genus Caecilia
 Genus Dermophis - see Family Dermophiidae 
 Genus Gegeneophis  - see Family Indotyphlidae
 Genus Geotrypetes - see Family Dermophiidae 
 Genus Grandisonia
 Genus Gymnopis - see Family Dermophiidae 
 Genus Herpele - see Family Herpelidae 
 Genus Hypogeophis - see Family Indotyphlidae 
 Genus Idiocranium - see Family Indotyphlidae
 Genus Indotyphlus - see Family Indotyphlidae
 Genus Luetkenotyphlus - see Family Siphonopidae 
 Genus Microcaecilia
 Genus Mimosiphonops - see Family Siphonopidae 
 Genus Oscaecilia
 Genus Parvicaecilia
 Genus Praslinia - see Family Indotyphlidae 
 Genus Schistometopum - see Family Dermophiidae 
 Genus Siphonops - see Family Siphonopidae 
  Family Chikilidae
 Genus Chikila
  Family Dermophiidae
 Genus Dermophis
 Genus Geotrypetes
 Genus Gymnopis
 Genus Schistometopum
  Family Herpelidae
 Genus Boulengerula
 Genus Herpele
  Family Ichthyophiidae
 Genus Caudacaecilia
 Genus Ichthyophis
 Genus Uraeotyphlus
  Family Indotyphlidae
 Genus Gegeneophis
 Genus Grandisonia - see Family Caeciliidae 
 Genus Hypogeophis
 Genus Idiocranium - Makumuno Assumbo caecilian
 Genus Indotyphlus
 Genus Praslinia - Praslin's caecilian
 Genus Sylvacaecilia
  Family Rhinatrematidae
 Genus Epicrionops
 Genus Rhinatrema
  Family Scolecomorphidae
 Genus Crotaphatrema
 Genus Scolecomorphus
  Family Siphonopidae
 Genus Brasilotyphlus
 Genus Caecilita - see Microcaecilia
 Genus Luetkenotyphlus
 Genus Microcaecilia
 Genus Mimosiphonops
 Genus Parvicaecilia - see Family Caeciliidae 
 Genus Siphonops 
  Family Typhlonectidae
 Genus Atretochoana
 Genus Chthonerpeton
 Genus Nectocaecilia
 Genus Potamotyphlus
 Genus Typhlonectes

See also

 Amphibian 
 Herping

Genera
Amphibians
Amphibians
Amphibian genera